László Ferenczy (1898 – 31 May 1946) was a lieutenant colonel in the Hungarian Royal Gendarmerie and member of its "central dejewification unit" during World War II and the Holocaust.

Born in Felsővisó, Ferenczy served from March 1940 to July 1942 with a unit that searched for Jews who had fled to Hungary from Slovakia. After Nazi Germany's invasion of Hungary in March 1944, he was appointed—on 25 March—as liaison between the Hungarian Royal Gendarmerie and the German security police, which meant he worked closely with SS officer Adolf Eichmann. Randolph Braham writes that Ferenczy's office was on the second floor of the Lomnic Hotel in the Svábhegy district of Budapest, near Eichmann's office in the Majestic Hotel.

During the Holocaust in Hungary in the spring and summer of 1944, Ferenczy helped to organize the deportation of over 434,000 of Hungary's Jews to the Auschwitz concentration camp in occupied Poland, where most were gassed on arrival. When Miklós Horthy, the Hungarian regent, ordered an end to the deportations in July, Ferenczy appeared to switch sides and in August made contact with the Budapest Aid and Rescue Committee, which was trying to make deals with Eichmann to halt the deportations. In October, when Ferenc Szálasi, head of the pro-Nazi Arrow Cross Party, became prime minister, Ferenczy was once again placed in charge of rounding up and deporting Jews.

Ferenczy stood trial in Hungary after the war and was hanged on 31 May 1946.

References

1898 births
1946 deaths
Blood for goods
Hungarian military personnel of World War II
People executed for war crimes
People from Vișeu de Sus
The Holocaust in Hungary
Executed Hungarian collaborators with Nazi Germany